San Miguel Cathedral may refer to:

 San Miguel Cathedral Basilica of Queen of Peace, San Miguel, El Salvador
 San Miguel Arcangel Metropolitan Cathedral, Tegucigalpa, Honduras
 San Miguel Arcangel Metropolitan Cathedral, Piura, Peru
 San Miguel Arcangel Cathedral, Gamu, Philippines
 San Miguel de Tucuman Cathedral, Tucuman, Argentina

See also
 Michael (archangel) or San Miguel
 Cathedral of Saint Michael (disambiguation)
 St. Michael's Church (disambiguation)
 Saint Michael (disambiguation)